Lithuania competed at the 1996 Summer Paralympics in Atlanta, United States.

Medalists

See also
Lithuania at the 1996 Summer Olympics

External links
International Paralympic Committee

References

Nations at the 1996 Summer Paralympics
1996
Paralympics